Ulila is a small borough in Elva Parish, Tartu County, Estonia. It has a population of 319 (as of 1 January 2010).

References

Boroughs and small boroughs in Estonia
Kreis Dorpat